The Jireh Chapel is a Strict Baptist place of worship in the town of Haywards Heath in the English county of West Sussex. The chapel was built in 1879.

Sussex has many 19th-century Independent and Baptist chapels in this Vernacular style: a tiled, gabled roof, porch, and red-brick walls with round-arched windows. This example was built in 1879 by William Knight, a horticulturist who was also the chapel's first pastor. It is a Gospel Standard movement chapel.

See also
 List of places of worship in Mid Sussex
 List of Strict Baptist churches

References

Bibliography

Churches completed in 1879
19th-century Baptist churches
Strict Baptist chapels
Baptist churches in West Sussex
19th-century churches in the United Kingdom
Haywards Heath